Paolo Lorenzi was the defending champion, but was defeated in the semifinals by Pablo Carreño Busta. 

Carreño Busta went on to win the title over Grégoire Burquier 6–4, 6–4 in the final.

Seeds

Draw

Finals

Top half

Bottom half

References
 Main Draw
 Qualifying Draw

Credit Agricole Friuladria Tennis Cup - Singles
2013 Singles
Zucchetti